BAG family molecular chaperone regulator 5 is a protein that in humans is encoded by the BAG5 gene.

The protein encoded by this gene is a member of the BAG1-related protein family. BAG1 is an anti-apoptotic protein that functions through interactions with a variety of cell apoptosis and growth related proteins including BCL-2, Raf-protein kinase, steroid hormone receptors, growth factor receptors and members of the heat shock protein 70 kDa family. This protein contains a BAG domain near the C-terminus, which could bind and inhibit the chaperone activity of Hsc70/Hsp70. Three transcript variants encoding two different isoforms have been found for this gene.

References

External links

Further reading